The 1964 NCAA University Division Track and Field Championships were contested June 18−20 at the 42nd annual NCAA-sanctioned track meet to determine the individual and team national champions of men's collegiate University Division track and field events in the United States. 

This year's meet was hosted by the University of Oregon at Hayward Field in Eugene. 

Oregon won the team national championship, the Ducks' second title in program history.

Program changes 
 Two new events, the 400 meter relay and the 1,600 meter relay, were added to the championship program. The inaugural titles were won by Illinois and California, respectively.

Team standings 
 Note: Top 10 only
 (H) = Hosts

Results

100 Meters

200 Meters
wind: +3.4

400 Meters

800 Meters

1500 Meters

5000 Meters

10,000 Meters

110-Meter Hurdles

400-Meter Hurdles

3,000-Meter Steeplechase

High Jump

Pole Vault

Long Jump

Triple Jump

Shot Put

Discus

Javelin

Hammer Throw

Decathlon

External links
Highlights

References

NCAA Men's Outdoor Track and Field Championship
NCAA University Division Track and Field Championships
NCAA
NCAA University Division Track and Field Championships